Anis Viktaravich Ananenka (born 29 November 1985, in Zhlobin) is a Belarusian middle-distance runner. At the 2012 Summer Olympics, he competed in the Men's 800 metres.

Doping
In July 2015 Ananenka was banned from sport for 4 years after testing positive for the black market drug GW1516. The ban ends 15 June 2019.

In March 2019 he was disqualified from the 2012 Summer Olympics after the re-analysis of his samples. Ananenka tested positive for oralturinabol.

Competition record

References
Citations

External links
IAAF profile

Belarusian male middle-distance runners
Doping cases in athletics
Belarusian sportspeople in doping cases
1985 births
Living people
Olympic athletes of Belarus
Athletes (track and field) at the 2012 Summer Olympics
World Athletics Championships athletes for Belarus
People from Zhlobin District
Sportspeople from Gomel Region